Muton is a term in genetics that means the smallest unit in a chromosome that can be changed by mutations. 

The term Muton was created by Seymour Benzer in 1955 after his work about the mapping of bacteriophages T4.

References

DNA
Chromosomes